Russell C. Elliott (1842–October 23, 1898) was a Union soldier who fought in the American Civil War. Elliott received the country's highest award for bravery during combat, the Medal of Honor, for his action at Natchitoches, Louisiana, on 19 April 1864. He was honored with the award on 20 November 1896.

Biography
Elliott was born in Concord, New Hampshire in 1842. He joined the Army from Boston in August 1862. He was commissioned as a Second Lieutenant in December 1864 and mustered out with his regiment in September 1865.  Elliott died on 23 October 1898, and his remains are interred at Woodlawn Cemetery and Crematory in Everett, Massachusetts.

Medal of Honor citation

See also

List of American Civil War Medal of Honor recipients: A–F

References

1842 births
1898 deaths
People of Massachusetts in the American Civil War
Union Army officers
United States Army Medal of Honor recipients
American Civil War recipients of the Medal of Honor